Beech Street may refer to:

 Beech Street (London), a street in central London, England
 Beech Street Historic District (Helena-West Helena, Arkansas), listed on the National Register of Historic Places
 Beech Street Historic District (Texarkana, Arkansas), listed on the National Register of Historic Places
 Beech Street Brick Street, Texas
 Beech Street School, New Jersey
 Gill Stadium in New Hampshire, formerly the Beech Street Grounds

See also
 Beach Street (disambiguation)